Unified System for Design Documentation (USDD, ESKD, ЕСКД, GOST 2.316-2013) is a subset of Russian State and Commonwealth of Independent States Standards (GOST) for technical drawings. Just like many GOSTs it's edited and issued by Russian Federal Agency on Technical Regulating and Metrology (Rosstandart) and international body of Euroasian Interstate council (EASC) subsidiary for standartisation.

The latest revision was published in 2013.

References

External links 

Unified system for design documentation., 2001 (RU)
Unified system for design documentation., 2008 (RU)
Unified system for design documentation. General principles., 2013 (RU) 

GOST standards
Science and technology in the Soviet Union